Haidar Mahmoud Majid (born 19 September 1973) is an Iraqi football coach and former player. As a player, Mahmoud played as a right-back, representing Iraq in the 1996 and 2000 AFC Asian Cup. He also played club football with Al Zawraa for 10 years.

International career
Mahmoud scored two goals in a 4–1 win over Thailand in the 1996 Asian Cup, and scored one in the 2000 Asian Cup in Lebanon in a 2–0 win, also over Thailand.

Managerial career
Mahmoud took charge of Iraqi Premier League club Al-Zawraa in 2009, until 28 August 2010, when his contract was terminated. Initially assistant coach of Zakho, he was then appointed head coach of the club, until the expiration of his contract on 22 September 2015. Mahmoud was head coach of Al-Sulaymaniyah for less than two weeks, between 28 October and 8 November 2017, before being appointed head coach of Karbalaa on 8 December 2017. He remained in charge until the termination of his contract on 25 April 2018.

Career statistics

International
Scores and results list Iraq's goal tally first, score column indicates score after each Mahmoud goal.

Honours 
Al-Zawraa
 Iraqi Premier League: 1995–96, 1998–99, 1999–2000, 2000–01, 2005–06
 Iraq FA Cup: 1995–96, 1997–98, 1998–99, 1999–2000

Individual
 Lebanese Premier League top scorer: 2001–02

References

External links
 
 

1973 births
Living people
Sportspeople from Baghdad
Iraqi footballers
Association football fullbacks
Al-Khutoot Al-Jawiya players
Al-Naft SC players
Al-Zawraa SC players
Al-Shorta SC players
Shabab Al Sahel FC players
Al-Shamal SC players
Iraqi Premier League players
Lebanese Premier League players
Qatar Stars League players
Iraqi football managers
Al-Zawraa SC managers
Zakho FC managers
Sulaymaniyah SC managers
Karbalaa FC managers
Iraqi Premier League managers
Iraq international footballers
1996 AFC Asian Cup players
2000 AFC Asian Cup players
Iraqi expatriate footballers
Iraqi expatriate sportspeople in Lebanon
Iraqi expatriate sportspeople in Qatar
Expatriate footballers in Lebanon
Expatriate footballers in Qatar
Lebanese Premier League top scorers